Warrnambool railway station is the terminus of the Warrnambool line in Victoria, Australia. It serves the city of Warrnambool, and it opened on 4 February 1890. 

It is the southernmost active regular passenger railway station on the Australian mainland (several other Victorian Railways lines such as the branch lines to Timboon and Crowes did venture further south but all have now closed).

Beyond the station, the line continues for a further five kilometres to Dennington, and is used by freight trains. On 26 April 1988, that section officially changed to being worked as a siding, and the train staff previously used for train movements between Warrnambool and Dennington was abolished. Beyond Dennington, the line used to continue for a further 37 kilometres to Port Fairy. That section was closed in November 1977.

On 14 July 2008, the siding serving the freight shed at the eastern (Up) end of the station was booked out of use, and the track was removed. The goods shed itself was demolished in August 2018, due to its poor structural condition.

As part of the Regional Rail Revival project, passenger services on the line are set to increase to five per weekday from 2022, after upgrade works along the line are completed and the commissioning of a passing lane at Boorcan, located between Camperdown and Terang stations. As part of this project, stabling facilities are also to be upgraded at Warrnambool, to allow VLocity trains to stable.

Announced as part of a $21.9 million package in the 2022/23 Victorian State Budget, Warrnambool Station, alongside others, will receive accessibility upgrades,and the installation of CCTV and platform shelters. The development process will begin in late 2022 or 2023, with a timeline for the upgrades to be released once construction has begun.

Platforms and services

Warrnambool has one platform. It is serviced by V/Line Warrnambool line services.

Platform 1:
 services to and from Southern Cross

Transport links

Transit South West operates three routes via Warrnambool station, under contract to Public Transport Victoria:
: Warrnambool – Dennington
: to Warrnambool (loop service via Lake Pertobe)
: Warrnambool – Merrivale

V/Line operates contracted road coach services from Warrnambool station to:
 Geelong station (via the Great Ocean Road)
 Ballarat station (via Ararat and Hamilton)
 Mount Gambier station (via Koroit, Port Fairy and Portland)

References

Railway stations in Australia opened in 1890
Regional railway stations in Victoria (Australia)
Warrnambool